Pucciniosira is a genus of rust fungi belonging to the family Pucciniosiraceae.

The type species is Pucciniosira triumfettae  which is now Pucciniosira pallidula.

The Pucciniosira species are characterized by having Puccinia-like teliospores that are produced in chains alternately with intercalary
cells. The sori have a continuous to rudimentary peridium (protective layer). In some species, the teliospores break easily into halves along their septa. They form circular groups of rust spores on the lower surfaces of the leaves of various species of plants (including solanum species).

The genus name of Pucciniosira is in honour of Tommaso Puccini (1666-1735), who was an Italian botanist and doctor. He taught Anatomy at Hospital of Santa Maria Nuova in Florence.

Distribution
The species of this genus are found in America (including north America, Ecuador, Honduras, Guatemala, Panama, and Mexico,) and Africa (including Nigeria,) , as well as New Zealand, and Australia (Gold Coast).

Ecology
In Veracruz within Mexico, species Pucciniosira pallidula  infects Heliocarpus donnellsmithii . Pucciniosira pallidula was also found on Triumfetta semitriloba  in Florida, USA.

In Panama, species Pucciniosira dorata is found on Triumfetta bogotensis (in Malvaceae family)

Pucciniosira holwayi  is found on Solanum laxiflorum (a synonym of Solanum barbeyanum) in Brazil. As well as  Pucciniosira hyphoperidiata  which is found on various solanum species. Pucciniosira solani  causes yellow leaf rust on solanum species in Brazil and Ecuador.

Species
As accepted by Species Fungorum;

Pucciniosira albida 
Pucciniosira anthocleistae 
Pucciniosira arthurii 
Pucciniosira brickelliae 
Pucciniosira clemensiae 
Pucciniosira cumminsiana 
Pucciniosira deightonii 
Pucciniosira dorata 
Pucciniosira eupatorii 
Pucciniosira holwayi 
Pucciniosira hyphoperidiata 
Pucciniosira mitragynae 
Pucciniosira pallidula 
Pucciniosira solani 
Pucciniosira tuberculata 

Former species, (all Pucciniosiraceae family) 
 P. cornuta  = Gambleola cornuta 
 P. dissotidis  = Puccinia dissotidis
 P. triumfettae  = Pucciniosira pallidula
 P. triumfettae  = Pucciniosira pallidula

References

Pucciniales
Basidiomycota genera